Teodor Rotrekl (6 June 1923 in Brno – 1 September 2004 in Prague) was a Czech illustrator and painter. His most known works are illustrations of science fiction books and journals.

External links
Biography (in Czech)
Links to some images of his work.
More links to some images of his work.

1923 births
2004 deaths
Artists from Brno
Czech illustrators